Prince Amponsah (born 29 December 1996) is a Ghananian footballer who plays as a striker for FK Pelister.

References

Living people
1996 births
Ghanaian footballers
Footballers from Accra
Association football forwards
Prince Amponsah
Prince Amponsah
FK Pelister players
Prince Amponsah
Prince Amponsah
Prince Amponsah
Macedonian First Football League players
Ghanaian expatriate footballers
Expatriate footballers in Thailand
Ghanaian expatriate sportspeople in Thailand
Expatriate footballers in North Macedonia
Ghanaian expatriate sportspeople in North Macedonia